BMS-345541, marketed by Merck KGaA, is an anti-inflammatory, cell-permeable quinoxaline compound. It is an allosteric site-binding inhibitor with a primary target of IKK-2 and blocks the NF-κB-dependent transcription in mice.

It has no approvals for human/medical use or for use in clinical trials. No clinical trials mention it.

References

Anti-inflammatory agents
Merck brands